Merumea is a genus of flowering plants in the family Rubiaceae. It is native to the Guiana Shield.

Species
Merumea coccocypseloides Steyerm. – southern Venezuela (Cerro Sipapo)
Merumea plicata Steyerm. – Guyana

References

Rubiaceae genera